WTCI (channel 45) is a PBS member television station in Chattanooga, Tennessee, United States. Owned by the Greater Chattanooga Public Television Corporation, the station maintains studios on Bonnyshire Drive in Chattanooga, and its transmitter is located on Sawyer Cemetery Road in unincorporated Mile Straight.

History
The Tennessee Department of Education began WTCI on March 4, 1970 on channel 45, as the third in a series of public television stations that included WLJT in Martin and WSJK-TV (now WETP) in the Tri-Cities and Knoxville; WCTE-TV in Cookeville followed later in the decade. It is now operated by the Greater Chattanooga Public Television Corporation, a non-profit community organization, which assumed the station's broadcast license in 1984.

WTCI offers a diverse mix of programming, featuring informational, cultural, and entertainment shows from both local and PBS sources to viewers in portions of four states (Tennessee, Georgia, Alabama, and North Carolina). However, some program duplication occurs with Georgia Public Broadcasting's North Georgia station, WNGH-TV, which operates at a much higher power and is seen in most of WTCI's broadcast range, including Chattanooga itself.

Shows created by WTCI include The A List, Tennessee Insider, First Things First, Southern Accents, and Chattanooga History Makers. It is also a member of The Tennessee Channel Network. It also carries the digital subchannel Create. WTCI Create and Tennessee Channel, airing on weekends, is on channel 45.2 and Comcast channel 208.

In 2003, WTCI relocated from its old studios located on the Chattanooga State Community College campus to its current location on Bonnyshire Drive, since the cost of renovating the 37-year-old building at CSCC was deemed prohibitive.

Technical information

Subchannels
The station's digital signal is multiplexed:

Analog-to-digital conversion
WTCI shut down its analog signal, over UHF channel 45, on February 17, 2009, the original target date in which full-power television stations in the United States were to transition from analog to digital broadcasts under federal mandate (which was later pushed back to June 12, 2009). The station's digital signal remained on its pre-transition UHF channel 29. Through the use of PSIP, digital television receivers display the station's virtual channel as its former UHF analog channel 45.

See also
 East Tennessee PBS (for more details on Tennessee's ETV network in the 1970s)

References

External links

TCI
PBS member stations
Television channels and stations established in 1970
1970 establishments in Tennessee